

Recipients
Here is a list of the award winners and the films for which they won.

 The year mentioned refers to the year in which the films released.

This is the list of Winners of Jury's Special Award

See also
 Tamil cinema
 Cinema of India

References

Actor